Juniper Tree is a Canadian drama film, directed by Micheline Lanctôt and released in 2003. Based in part on the Brothers Grimm's fairy tale The Juniper Tree, the film stars Sylvie Drapeau as Esther, a depressed woman interacting with police officer Laurier (Frédérick De Grandpré) after failing in an attempt to kill herself and her children.

Drapeau received a Prix Jutra nomination for Best Actress at the 6th Genie Awards.

References

External links
 

2003 films
Canadian drama films
Films shot in Quebec
Films set in Quebec
Films directed by Micheline Lanctôt
French-language Canadian films
2000s Canadian films